A Winter Tale is a 2007 Canadian drama film written, directed and produced by Frances-Anne Solomon, featuring Canadian actor Peter Williams and Caribbean stars Leonie Forbes and Dennis "Sprangalang" Hall.  It premiered at the ReelWorld Film Festival where it won Solomon the Outstanding Canadian Feature Film Award, as well as Special Mention in the Outstanding Screenplay category. It subsequently screened at the Montreal World Film Festival, Atlantic Film Festival, Bite The Mango Film Festival (Closing Night), Trinidad and Tobago Film Festival (Opening Night, Best Feature Award) & The New York African Diaspora Film Festival (U.S. Premiere - Opening Night).

Synopsis

A Winter Tale tells the story of a Black men's support group that begins to meet at a Caribbean Takeaway restaurant in the aftermath of the shooting death of a local child. It was developed through a collaborative improvisational process with the cast, who were drawn from Toronto's Caribbean and multicultural communities. It was shot on location in Parkdale, Toronto.

Cast

 Peter Williams as Gene
 Leonie Forbes as Miss G.
 Michael Miller as DX
 Dennis "Sprangalang" Hall	as Professa
 p! Barrington as Clip
 R. O. Glasgow as Lloyd
 Sabio Emerencia Collins as Andrew
 Lucky Ejim as Sam
 Peter N. Bailey as Ian
 Ryan Ishmael as Sibeka
 Mike G. Yohannes as Mickey
 Valerie Buhagiar as Elaine
 Finlandia Casellas as Rain
 Nicole Stamp as Julie
 Shakura S'aida as Charmaine
 Bobby Del Rio as Guy

Production

The script was developed between 2003 and 2006 by Michele Lonsdale Smith and Frances-Anne Solomon, working collaboratively with the actors. Production began in Feb 2006, on location in Parkdale Toronto and some pickups were shot a year later in January 2007. Editing and post-production were completed in April 2007.

Critical reception
"A Winter Tale" launched the "ReelWorld Film Festival 2007", and won the Tonya Lee Williams Award for Outstanding Canadian Feature, as well as Special Mention in the Outstanding Screenplay category.

It also won the following awards at diverse festivals: 2007 Audience Award for Best Feature Film at the Trinidad & Tobago Film Festival, 2008 Award for Best Foreign Film at the San Diego Black Film Festival, 2008 Remi Award - Best Editing Worldfest Houston Int Film Festival, 2008 Zuma Film Festival, Nigeria: Award for Best Editor, Award for Best Cinematographer & Ousmane Sembene Award for Best Foreign Film, and the 2008 Festival of Black International Cinema Berlin - Best Film.

It screened at the following festivals among others: Montreal World Film Festival (Pick of The Fest, Montreal Gazette), Atlantic Film Festival, Trinidad & Tobago Film festival (Opening Gala), Bite The Mango Film Festival (Closing Night Gala), Abuja Film Festival, 15th New York African Diaspora Film Festival (Opening Night Gala), Best of The New York African Diaspora Film Festival, Los Angeles Pan African Film Festival, Atlanta Women of Color Arts and Film Festival (Opening Night), Kasserian Ingera (Opening Night).

Lead actor Leonie Forbes was honored at the ReelWorld Film Festival with an Award of Excellence, and both Forbes & actor Peter Williams were honored by the Jamaican Consulate, New York and City of New York for their roles in the film.

A Winter Tale opened theatrically in Toronto on Feb 13 at the Revue Cinema, and then at Rainbow Cinema Woodbine. It opened in Jamaica on April 9 on general release to very positive critical reception, followed by Trinidad (May 13) and Antigua (May 22).

External links
 
 A Winter Tale official production website
 Leda Serene Films: Production Company website

2007 films
English-language Canadian films
Canadian drama films
2000s English-language films
2000s Canadian films